Kirill Vadimovich Minovalov (also Cyril Minovalov; born April 22, 1971, Moscow, Soviet Union) is a Russian businessman. In 2019 he has assets 850 million $.

Biography
Kirill Minovalov graduated in Systems Engineering from Moscow Institute for Railway Engineering in 1993. He was quick to take advantage of Russia's economic reforms in the early 1990s. In 1994, he founded the bank "" and still serves as its president and core shareholder. Then he became engaged in the malting business, building the largest malting company in Germany. In 2006, he bought the assets of the bankrupt company  and created Avangard Malz which has the capacity of more than 340000 mt of malt per year. According to Forbes, Minovalov is the 132nd richest person in Russia.

On September 19, 2011, luxury vehicles knocked down and killed four Moldovan workers on the road to Domodedovo International Airport. According to activists of the Blue Buckets movement, Kirill Minovalov was a passenger in the cortege.

References

External links 
 Kirill Minovalov’s biography 
 Interview // Vedomosti

Russian bankers
1971 births
Living people
21st-century Russian businesspeople
Businesspeople in the drink industry